Owsley B. Frazier Stadium is a multi-purpose stadium on the campus of Bellarmine University in Louisville, Kentucky. The facility serves as home to Bellarmine's soccer, field hockey, lacrosse, and track and field teams. The stadium opened on August 24, 2007 in a Bellarmine Knights women's soccer game, and was officially dedicated on August 28, 2007. Construction took approximately 18 months and was completed at an estimated cost of $5.1 million.

Innovative features
Owsley B. Frazier Stadium incorporates several innovative features, including:

 Artificial turf. The artificial turf at the stadium has permanent markings for soccer, field hockey, and lacrosse. A complex drainage system is incorporated into the design to allow for play in all weather conditions. The "24/7" artificial field surface is named Joseph P. and Janet A. Clayton Field.
 Stadium lighting. The lighting system features redirected lighting which bends spill lighting back on to the field, drastically reducing the amount of light which will fall outside the stadium's perimeter.
 Track surface. The track is an eight-lane, 400-meter track, featuring three long jump pits, two pole vault areas, a high jump pit, and a steeplechase water jump pit. The surface is a dual-durometer, polyurethane poured surface provided by Beynon Sport Surfaces, the same company which has installed tracks at other top college facilities over the past three years including Illinois, Maryland, and Purdue.

Recent developments
On February 20, 2010, the plaza area of the stadium was named after men's lacrosse coach Jack McGetrick. The plaza houses the locker rooms, concessions, and restrooms for the stadium. McGetrick started the lacrosse program at Bellarmine in 2004 and is well known throughout the lacrosse community.

References

Bellarmine Knights
Sports venues in Louisville, Kentucky
College lacrosse venues in the United States
Sports venues completed in 2007
Soccer venues in Kentucky
Lacrosse venues in the United States
2007 establishments in Kentucky
College track and field venues in the United States
Athletics (track and field) venues in Kentucky